Wenzel Raimund Johann Birck (also spelled "Pirck", "Birk", "Birckh", "Pirckh", "Pürk", and "Pürck") (1718–1763) was one of the early proponents of Symphonic music in Vienna, along with Georg Christoph Wagenseil and Georg Matthias Monn, and an early tutor for Mozart. Birck also, along with Georg Christoph Wagenseil tutored a young Joseph Haydn. He was the court organist for Maria Theresia and the music teacher for emperor Joseph II.

See also
 Wolfgang Amadeus Mozart
 Symphony

References
 Biba, Otto. 2001. "Pirck, Wenzel Raimund (Johann)". The New Grove Dictionary of Music and Musicians, ed. S. Sadie and J. Tyrrell. London: Macmillan.
 American Fact Finders: Ludwig van Beethoven
 The Mozart Project

Notes 

18th-century Austrian people
18th-century classical composers
18th-century Austrian male musicians
Austrian Classical-period composers
Composers from Vienna
Musicians from Vienna
1718 births
1763 deaths
Austrian male classical composers